Bogen may refer to:

Places
 Germany
 Bogen, Germany, a town in the district of Straubing-Bogen, Bavaria
 Straubing-Bogen, a district in Bavaria
 Hoher Bogen, a mountain range in Bavaria
 Landkreis Bogen, a former Landkreis in Niederbayern

 Norway
 Bogen, Evenes, a village in Evenes municipality, Nordland
 Bogen Chapel (Evenes), a chapel in the village of Bogen in Evenes
 Bogen, Steigen, a village in Steigen municipality, Nordland
 Bogen Chapel (Steigen), a chapel in the village of Bogen in Steigen
 Bogen (Austra), a hamlet on Austra island, Nordland

 South Georgia
 Bogen Glacier, a glacier on South Georgia island

Other uses
 Bogen (surname), a surname
 Bogen Imaging, the US distributor of photographic products made by Italian manufacturer Manfrotto Group
 Bogen Communications, an audio electronics company based in Ramsey, New Jersey

See also
 Bogan (disambiguation)